Heron Communications was a production company, distributor and a subsidiary of Gerald Ronson's Heron International.

It owns various home video companies, including Heron Home Entertainment (formerly Videoform Pictures), which had a joint venture with PolyGram Video, in order to set up Channel 5 Video.

In 1984, it bought out Media Home Entertainment, including The Nostalgia Merchant, which two years later, in 1986, set up a kid-friendly label of Heron, Hi-Tops Video, which hired two Family Home Entertainment executives to run the studio. Also that year, the company had set up Fox Hills Video as a sellthrough video label, with The Nostalgia Merchant branding to be used as a flagship of the Fox Hills label, and hired two home video veterans to run the studio.

On July 22, 1987, Heron Communications teamed up with fledging film distributor Troma Entertainment to distribute nine films on videocassette through the Media Home Entertainment label, and decided to co-finance and distribute up to seven made-for video programs from Cox Video and executive producer Alan Landsburg on the Fox Hills Video label, and as for the Cox deal, paid $750,000 is to focus on non-fictional programming in such areas as sports and history.

In October 1987, it entered into an agreement with NFL Films that would make Fox Hills the distributor for titles produced by the NFL Films Home Video Library for ten made-for-video productions per year and brought down an advance payment for $8 million to cover the first two-and-a-half years, plus a royalty for the NFL/Fox Hills home video agreement.

In late October 1987, Heron Communications had filed a lawsuit against American film producer/distributor Vista Organization, charging that Vista, along with its chairman and president with fraud and breach of contract, and alleges the firm has home video rights to ten pictures produced by the Vista Organization, namely Maid to Order, Fright Night Part II, Dudes, Leader of the Band, Penitent, Remote Control, Rented Lips, Pass the Ammo, Nightflyers and Tweeners, and Steve Diener said that Vista is attempting to renege on the merger with Carolco Pictures, and Seymour Malamed said that the initial attempt by Heron was for a temporary restraining order.

Filmography

As a production company
Desire and Hell at Sunset Motel (1991) ... Production Company
The Perfect Bride (1991) (TV) ... Production Company
A Nightmare on Elm Street 5: The Dream Child (1989) ... Production Company (presents)
The Adventures of Ronald McDonald: McTreasure Island (1989) (V) ... Production Company
A Nightmare on Elm Street 4: The Dream Master (1988) ... Production Company (presents)
The Hidden (1987) ... Production Company
A Nightmare on Elm Street 3: Dream Warriors (1987) ... Production Company (presents)
I Am Not a Freak (1987) (TV) ... Production Company (as Heron Communications Inc.)
The Ladies Club (1986) ... Production Company
A Nightmare on Elm Street Part 2: Freddy's Revenge (1985) ... Production Company (presents)
A Stranger Is Watching (1982) ... Production Company

As a distributor
Il cacciatore di squali (1979) ... Distributor (1987) (USA) (VHS)
Flight to Mars (1951) ... Distributor (1987) (USA) (VHS)
The Set-Up (1949) ... Distributor (1987) (USA) (VHS)

Assets
Media Home Entertainment (1978–1993)
Hi-Tops Video (1984–1993)
The Nostalgia Merchant (1978-)
Fox Hills Video (1986–1992)
Channel 5 Video (joint venture with PolyGram) (1986-1992)

References

Film production companies of the United States